Aqua Lung America (formerly U.S. Divers Company) is an American company based in Vista, California which makes scuba equipment. The company is a division of Aqua Lung International, which was, for most of its existence, a division of Air Liquide. Aqua Lung International was sold by Air Liquide to Montagu Private Equity by the end of 2016. After U.S. Divers Company was renamed Aqua Lung America, the name U.S. Divers was retained as a trademark for Aqua Lung's line of snorkelling equipment.

History

The "Aqua-Lung" regulator was created by Jacques-Yves Cousteau and Émile Gagnan in 1943. In 1946, the company known as La Spirotechnique (now Aqua Lung International) was established by both men together with Jean Delorme, CEO of Air Liquide, as a division of Air Liquide to sell the Aqua-Lung regulators.

In the United States, the Aqua-Lung regulator was first sold in the late 1940s by René Sporting Goods, a sporting goods store in Los Angeles, California owned by René Bussoz. He soon obtained a contract with La Spirotechnique to import Aqua-Lung equipment into the United States for sale on the Pacific coast (Spaco, Inc. had the contract for the Atlantic coast).

In 1952, Bussoz changed the name of his company to "U.S. Divers Company" and registered the Aqua-Lung trademark in the United States. In 1957, Bussoz sold the company and the trade names to La Spirotechnique.

Around 2003, U.S. Divers Company was renamed Aqua Lung America after La Spirotechnique changed its name to Aqua Lung International. The U.S. Divers name is maintained as a trademark for Aqua Lung's line of snorkelling equipment.

References

External links
Aqua Lung's website
Military section of Aqua Lung's website

Diving equipment manufacturers
Companies based in San Diego County, California
Sporting goods manufacturers of the United States
Vista, California
1952 establishments in California
American companies established in 1952
Manufacturing companies established in 1952